The Big East Conference Men's Basketball Most Improved Player award is given to the men's basketball player in the Big East Conference voted as the most improved by the conference coaches. It was first awarded at the end of the 1996–97 season.

Key

Winners

References

External links 
Big East Conference Most Improved Player Winners at Sports-Reference.com

Big East Conference men's basketball
Awards established in 1997